N. Ramakrishnan (born 30 July 1949) is an Indian politician and a member of the Tamil Nadu Legislative Assembly from the Cumbum constituency. He represents the Dravida Munnetra Kazhagam (DMK) party and has previously represented the Marumalarchi Dravida Munnetra Kazhagam (MDMK).

N. Ramakrishnan was born on 30 July 1949 in Cumbum. He has a master's degree and is married with two children.

N. Ramakrishnan was first elected to the Tamil Nadu Legislative Assembly from Cumbum in 1989 as a DMK candidate. The seat changed hands in the 1991 elections and it was not until those of 2006 that he was re-elected, this time as a candidate for MDMK. He returned to the DMK and won the seat in a by-election in 2009, followed by success in the 2011 state elections. He lost to S. T. K. Jakkaiyan in 2016. He won the seat back in the 2021 state election.

In April 2012, Ramakrishnan was one of four DMK MLAs suspended from the legislature for ten days after they had staged a walk-out and shouted slogans at the Speaker, D. Jayakumar.

References 

Tamil Nadu MLAs 2021–2026
Tamil Nadu MLAs 2011–2016
Dravida Munnetra Kazhagam politicians
Living people
1949 births
People from Theni district
Marumalarchi Dravida Munnetra Kazhagam politicians
Tamil Nadu MLAs 2006–2011
Vokkaliga politicians